A severe tropical storm is the third highest category used by the Japan Meteorological Agency (JMA) to classify tropical cyclones in the Northwest Pacific basin. The basin is limited to the north of the equator between the 100th meridian east and the 180th meridian. The category of the severe tropical storm is defined as a tropical cyclone that has 10-minute sustained wind speeds of between 48 and 63 knots (89–117 km/h; 55–73 mph).

Background

The Northwest Pacific basin covers a vast area in the Pacific Ocean, located north of the equator, between 100°E and 180°E. Several weather agencies monitor this basin, however it is officially monitored by the Japan Meteorological Agency (JMA, RSMC Tokyo), who is responsible for forecasting, naming and issuing warnings for tropical cyclones. Unofficially, the Joint Typhoon Warning Center also monitors the basin, however these warnings measures 1-minute sustained wind speeds, comparing their scale to the Saffir–Simpson scale. The JMA uses a simpler scale on classifying tropical cyclones adapted by the ESCAP/WMO Typhoon Committee measuring 10-minute sustained wind speeds, ranging from a tropical depression, tropical storm, severe tropical storm and typhoon.

This article covers a list of systems developing in the Northwest Pacific basin that were classified by the JMA's category of a severe tropical storm. The category of a severe tropical storm ranges with 10-minute sustained winds of 48–63 kn (25–32 m/s; 55–72 mph; 89–117 km/h).

Systems
Key
 Discontinuous duration (weakened below Severe tropical storm then restrengthened to that classification at least once)

1977–1979

1980s

1990s

2000s
The JMA tracked a total of 42 severe tropical storms from 2000 through to 2009. Fortunately, many of these storms did not affect any landmass, however there were a few notable storms like Kammuri in 2002 and Bilis in 2006 which both impacted mainland China, killing hundreds of people and causing total combined damages of nearly US$5 billion. Bilis ended up killing a total of 859 people, making it one of the deadliest storms in China, and also, being known as the tenth wettest tropical cyclone in the country.

2010s
From 2010 to 2019, the JMA tracked a total of 52 severe tropical storms. In December 2011, Severe Tropical Storm Washi impacted the southern part of the Philippines, killing a total of 2,546 people, making it one of the deadliest tropical cyclones to hit the country. Mekkhala in January 2015 also affected the Philippines, but was notable for interrupting Pope Francis’ visit to the country. Nine months later saw the most damaging severe tropical storm of the decade, where Etau mainly affected Japan, causing damages of up to ¥294 billion (US$2.44 billion) due to extreme flooding and various landslides. Moreover, Tropical Storm Pewa moved into the Northwest Pacific basin from the Central Pacific and was classified as a severe tropical storm by the JMA.

2020s
As of 2021, seven severe tropical storms have developed this decade.

Climatology

See also

Typhoon
Pacific typhoon season
 Pacific typhoon season

References

External links
Japan Meteorological Agency

Severe tropical storms
WPAC STS